, a.k.a. An Affair with a Woman in Mourning, is a 2001 Japanese Pink film directed by Daisuke Gotō. It is a suspense-pink film in homage to The Postman Always Rings Twice (1946). It won the Silver Prize at the Pink Grand Prix ceremony. Personnel awards also went to Mayuko Sasaki for Best Actress, 2nd place and Masahide Iioka for Cinematography.

Synopsis
Tomoko, the wife of an impotent and bitter man, hires a younger man to help her run her printing press business. She becomes involved in an affair with him.

Cast
 Mayuko Sasaki: Tomiko Tachibana
 Koharu Yamasaki: Kyōko Yano
 Yukijirō Hotaru: Yutaka
 Kenichi Kanbe: Patient on crutches
 Shiori Kawamura: Nurse / Kaori
 Hiroyuki Kawasaki: Hiroyuki
 Keisaku Kimura: Ryūzō Sakata
 Yoshikata Matsuki: Mamoru Tachibana
 Kanae Mizuhara: Kanae
 Kumiko Mori: Kumiko
 Hōryū Nakamura: Akira
 Toshimasa Niiro: Akio

Bibliography

English

Japanese

References

2001 films
2000s erotic films
2000s Japanese-language films
Pink films
Shintōhō Eiga films
2000s pornographic films
2000s Japanese films